The Mount Chappell Island, part of the Badger Group within the Furneaux Group, is a  unpopulated granite island with a distinctive central hill, located in Bass Strait, lying west of the Flinders and Cape Barren islands, Tasmania, south of Victoria, in south-eastern Australia.

The island was originally named Mount Chappelle by Matthew Flinders for his wife's maiden name. The island is private property, used for grazing sheep and Cape Barren geese, and is a classic example of natural habitat degradation caused by human activities.  The island forms part of the Chalky, Big Green and Badger Island Groups Important Bird Area.

Fauna
The island's habitats have been severely modified by slashing, ploughing, grazing and burning. Short-tailed shearwaters breed there. Little penguins used to breed in large numbers but have since ceased to do so.  Apart from sheep, mammals introduced deliberately or inadvertently are the house mouse, a species of rat and feral cats.  Reptiles present include Bougainville's skink, spotted skink, metallic skink, three-lined skink and tiger snake.

See also

 List of islands of Tasmania

References

Furneaux Group
Important Bird Areas of Tasmania
Islands of Bass Strait
Islands of North East Tasmania